Frankie "Shorty" Moniz (misspelled Muniz and Munitz) (September 26, 1911 – June 18, 2004) was an American soccer player who spent six seasons in the American Soccer League and earned two caps with the U.S. national team.

In 1935, Moniz signed with the Kearny Scots in the American Soccer League.  At some point he moved to the Pawtucket Rangers.  In 1941, he left the ASL and joined the Fall River, Massachusetts Ponta Delgada S.C. which won the 1947 National Challenge Cup and National Amateur Cup.  Based on these result, the U.S. Soccer Federation selected the club to act as the U.S. national team at the 1947 NAFC Championship.  As a result, Moniz earned two caps with the U.S. national team.  In the first game, the U.S. 5-0 to Mexico and in the second, they lost 5-2 to Cuba.

Moniz served in the U.S. Army during World War II and later owned a Sunoco gas station.  He was inducted into the New England Soccer Hall of Fame in 1984.

References

External links
 Obituary

1911 births
2004 deaths
Sportspeople from Fall River, Massachusetts
Soccer players from Massachusetts
American soccer players
American Soccer League (1933–1983) players
Kearny Scots players
Pawtucket Rangers players
United States men's international soccer players
Ponta Delgada S.C. players
United States Army personnel of World War II
Association football forwards